Wallan railway station is located on the North East line in Victoria, Australia. It serves the town of Wallan, and opened on 18 April 1872.

History
The station opened as Wallan Wallan on 18 April 1872, the North East line to Wodonga having opened a few months earlier. The main town on the Hume Highway has since become known as Wallan, while the township beside the railway has become known as Wallan East.

The first goods shed was provided in 1873, with a loading platform for timber erected the following year. In 1876, the goods shed was replaced, and the current wooden building on the down platform (Platform 2) provided. The first lever frame was provided in 1895, with a separate signal box on the Up platform (Platform 1) provided in 1916.

Wallan was provided with a number of sidings to marshal trains for the Heathcote line, which branched off the North East line at Heathcote Junction. Due to increasing timber traffic on the Heathcote line, the yard was substantially expanded in 1913, including sidings worked by gravity. In 1933, an additional  turntable was provided.

In 1962, the Melbourne–Albury standard gauge line was opened, running behind Platform 1, with a passing loop provided to the east of Wallan station. The loop was extended by 650 metres, from 900m to 1500m, in 2000. Also in 1962, boom barriers were provided at the Wallan Road level crossing, located nearby in the up direction of the station.

Between 1961 and 1965, the locomotive servicing facilities were removed, while the late 1980s and early 1990s saw the removal of the remaining sidings. Further removal of a number of points and signals was undertaken in April 1991. It was also around this time that a crossover was provided at the Down end of the station. The signal box was removed in 1995, and replaced by a new lever frame in the station building. The frame was built from parts of the Craigieburn frame, and was the last new frame to be installed on a mainline railway in Victoria.

In August 2018, plans for a station upgrade were announced, as part of the Regional Rail Revival project. Works included the provision of more car parking spaces, an upgraded bus interchange, extra platform shelters, and a lengthening of the Melbourne-bound platform at the up end, to accommodate six-carriage trains. The upgrades to the bus interchange and the car park had been completed by November 2019, with the remaining works completed by early 2020.

Beveridge station, now demolished, was located between Wallan and Donnybrook stations.

Platforms and services
Wallan has two side platforms. It is served by V/Line Seymour and Shepparton line trains.

Platform 1:
 services to Southern Cross
 services to Southern Cross

Platform 2:
 services to Seymour
 services to Shepparton

Transport links
Mitchell Transit operates five routes to and from Wallan station, under contract to Public Transport Victoria:

: to Wallan Central
: to Springridge
: to Wallara Waters
: to Springridge
: to Wallara Waters

See also
 2020 Wallan derailment

References

External links

Victorian Railway Stations gallery

Railway stations in Australia opened in 1872
Regional railway stations in Victoria (Australia)
Shire of Mitchell